Arne Nøst (born 17 July 1962) is a Norwegian graphic artist and theatre director. He was born in Molde, and is educated as a graphic artist at the Norwegian National Academy of Fine Arts. He has illustrated several books, contributed to newspapers, and been responsible for decoration of buildings. He was a theatre director at the Rogaland Teater from 2009 to 2017.

References

External links 
 Works and biography 
 Arne Nøst blir teatersjef 

1962 births
People from Molde
Norwegian theatre directors
Living people